La Disparition is Keren Ann's second album, co-written with Benjamin Biolay.

Track listing

Keren Ann albums
2002 albums
Capitol Records albums